Cytochrome P450, family 11, also known as CYP11, is a chordate cytochrome P450 monooxygenase family. This family contains many enzymes involved in steroidogenesis, such as Cholesterol side-chain cleavage enzyme (CYP11A1), Steroid 11β-hydroxylase (CYP11B1) and Aldosterone synthase (CYP11B2). CYP11 can be divided into A to E five subfamilies, and CYP11A are the ohonologues to CYP11C, which duplicated during 2R event, and the tetrapod's CYP11B evolved from CYP11C of its fish ancestors, CYP11D and F found in amphioxus. These are not the typical CYP subfamilies, which share at least 40% amino acid identity, members between CYP11A and B subfamily are only 37.5-38.8% identical, and the CYP11D and E genes seen in modern lancelet (Branchiostoma floridae, an ancient branch of chordate animals) is 39% identical to catfish CYP11A1.

References 

Animal genes
11
Protein families